Erich Itor Kahn (23 July 1905 - 5 March 1956) was a German composer of Jewish descent, who emigrated to the United States during the years of National Socialism.

Biography
He was born in Rimbach in the Odenwald, the son of Leopold Kahn, a mathematician and synagogue cantor. He studied piano and composition at the Hoch Conservatory in Frankfurt, where his teachers included Paul Franzen and  Bernhard Sekles; he concluded his studies in 1928, although he had been giving public recitals of classical and contemporary repertoire since 1919. He then worked for Radio Frankfurt as a pianist, harpsichordist, composer and arranger, reporting to Hans Rosbaud, director of the Radio's music department. In this capacity he met many leading contemporary composers, and on 29 January 1930 gave the world premiere of the Piano Piece op. 33a by Arnold Schoenberg. 

In April 1933 he was dismissed from his post by the Nazis and emigrated to Paris with his wife Frida (née Rabinowitch). There he became friendly with René Leibowitz, to whom he introduced Schoenberg's Twelve-note technique. At the beginning of World War II he was interned as an enemy alien at the Camp des Milles in the southeastern France;  although in May 1941 Kahn and his wife were permitted to emigrate to the United States. He worked as a pianist and teacher in New York. He founded the Albeneri Trio with Alexander Schneider and Benar Heifetz, with whom he made many recordings. In 1955, after giving a piano recital, Kahn suffered a cerebral haemorrhage and spent many months in a coma until his death at Mount Sinai Hospital in New York. Kahn wrote several distinctive keyboard works including the Ciaconna dei tempi di guerra (1943) composed for Ralph Kirkpatrick to play on the harpsichord, though it is also performable on piano.

References
Adapted from an essay by Juan Allende-Blin in the booklet notes of Cybele SACD 160.403.

1905 births
1956 deaths
German classical composers
20th-century classical composers
Hoch Conservatory alumni
German male classical composers
20th-century German composers
20th-century German male musicians